The Bohusläns Fotbollförbund (Bohuslän Football Association) is one of the 24 district organisations of the Swedish Football Association. It administers lower tier football in the historical province of Bohuslän.

Background 

Bohusläns Fotbollförbund, commonly referred to as Bohusläns FF, is the governing body for football in the historical province of Bohuslän in Västra Götaland County. The Association was founded in 1917 and currently has 70 member clubs.  Based in Henån, the Association's Chairman is Stefan Herre Eriksson.

Affiliated Members 

The following clubs are affiliated to the Bohusläns FF:

Bokenäs IF
Bovallstrands IF
Bullarens GOIF
DFK Valla
Dyröns IF
FC Herrsta
Fjällbacka IK
Footballclub Stenungsunds IF
Gilleby IF
Gilleby-Stala Orust FC
Grebbestads IF
Groheds IF
Grundsunds IF
Hällevadsholms SK
Hamburgsunds IF
Hedekas IF
Henån FC
Henåns IF
Herrestads AIF
Hogstorps FK
Hogstorps IF
Hunnebostrands GOIF
IF Uddevallakamraterna
IFK Lane
IFK Strömstad
IFK Uddevalla
IFK Valla
IK Oddevold
IK Rössö Uddevalla
IK Rössö United
IK Svane
Käringöns IF
Kungshamns IF
Lane FC
Ljungskile SK
Lyse FF
Lysekils FF
Mollösunds IF
Morlanda GOIF
Munkedals IF
Myckleby FK
Myckleby IK
Rabbalshede IK
Rönnängs FF
Rosseröds IK
Sibräcka GOIF
Skärhamns FC
Skärhamns IK
Skee IF
Skredsviks SK
Slättens IK
Smögens IF
Sotenäs DFF
Sotenäs FC
Stala IF
Stångenäs AIS
Stångenäs FF
Stenshults IF
Stenungsunds Futsal Förening
Stenungsunds IF
Svarteborg Dingle IF
Svenshögens SK
Tanums IF
Tjörns DFF
Torp GOIF
Uddevalla IS
Vallens FF
Vallens IF
Ödsmåls IK
Överby IF

League Competitions 
Bohusläns FF run the following League Competitions:

Men's Football
Division 4  -  one section (with Dalslands FF)
Division 5  -  one section
Division 6  -  two sections

Women's Football
Division 3  -  one section (with Dalslands FF)
Division 4  - one section (with Dalslands FF)
Division 5  -  one section

Footnotes

External links 
 Bohusläns FF Official Website 

Bohuslans
Football in Västra Götaland County
Sports organizations established in 1917
1917 establishments in Sweden